In medicine, wasting, also known as wasting syndrome, refers to the process by which a debilitating disease causes muscle and fat tissue to "waste" away. Wasting is sometimes referred to as "acute malnutrition" because it is believed that episodes of wasting have a short duration, in contrast to stunting, which is regarded as chronic malnutrition. An estimated 45 million children under 5 years of age (or 6.7%) were wasted in 2021. Prevalence is highest in Southern Asia, followed by Oceania (excluding Australia and New Zealand) and South-eastern Asia.

Causes
Wasting can be caused by an extremely low energy intake (e.g., caused by famine), nutrient losses due to infection, or a combination of low intake and high loss. Infections and conditions associated with wasting include tuberculosis, chronic diarrhea, AIDS, and superior mesenteric artery syndrome. The mechanism may involve cachectin – also called tumor necrosis factor, a macrophage-secreted cytokine. Caretakers and health providers can sometimes contribute to wasting if the patient is placed on an improper diet. Voluntary weight loss and eating disorders are excluded as causes of wasting.

Diagnosis

Classification
 Children: Weight-for-height (WFH). In infants under 24 months, recumbent (supine) length is used. WFH as % of median reference value is calculated this way:

Cutoff points may vary, but <80% (close to −2 Z-score) is often used.
 Adults:
 Body Mass Index (BMI) is the quotient between weight and height squared (kg/m2). An individual with a BMI < 18.5 is regarded as a case of wasting.
 Percent of body weight lost (At Tufts, an unintentional loss of 6% or more in 6 months is regarded as wasting)

Treatment 
Antiretrovirals and anabolic steroids have been used to treat HIV wasting syndrome. Additionally, an increase in protein-rich foods such as peanut butter and legumes (dried beans and peas) can assist in controlling the loss of muscle mass.

See also
 Anorexia
 Atrophy
 Cachexia
 Superior mesenteric artery syndrome
 Weight loss

References

External links

 Chronic Wasting Disease and Potential Transmission to Humans, Center for Disease Control and Prevention
 Unintentional Weight Loss/Wasting, Tufts University Nutrition/Infection Unit

Symptoms and signs